Nyala is an extinct town in Nye County, in the U.S. state of Nevada.

History
A post office called Nyala was in operation between 1914 and 1936. In 1941, the population was 68.  The community's name is derived from Nye County.

References

Ghost towns in Nye County, Nevada